

Ti-Tree Airfield (ICAO:YTIT), also known as Ti Tree aeroplane landing area (ALA) is a landing strip in the Northern Territory of Australia located in the town of Ti-Tree.

Description 
The airfield is located on the east side of the town and the Stuart Highway. The airfield is owned by the Northern Territory Government and operated by the local government authority, the Central Desert Region.

Future developments
The proposed work included the increasing the width of the runway and the provision of a terminal building.

Accidents and incidents

See also
List of airports in the Northern Territory

References 

Airports in the Northern Territory